Herbert Dixon, 1st Baron Glentoran, OBE, PC (NI), DL (23 January 1880 – 20 July 1950) was a Unionist politician from Ireland, present day Northern Ireland.

Early life
Dixon was born in Belfast, the fourth son of Sir Daniel Dixon, 1st Baronet, and Annie Shaw. He was educated at Rugby School and the Royal Military College, Sandhurst, before being commissioned into the Royal Inniskilling Fusiliers as a second lieutenant on 20 January 1900. He was promoted to lieutenant on 14 May 1901, and served with the 6th (Inniskilling) Dragoons in the Second Boer War in South Africa in 1902. After the war he returned home in September 1902, and was posted at Curragh Camp. He later fought with the British Army in the First World War.

Political career
In 1918 Dixon was elected Unionist Member of Parliament for the seat of Belfast Pottinger, becoming representative for Belfast East four years later. He was also sent to the Northern Ireland House of Commons in 1921 as a member for Belfast East, being appointed Parliamentary Secretary to the Ministry of Finance, and was finally elected member for the seat of Belfast Bloomfield in 1929.

Dixon was appointed OBE in 1919 and admitted to the Privy Council of Northern Ireland in 1923. In 1939 he was raised to the peerage as Baron Glentoran, of Ballyalloly in the County of Down. He served as Parliamentary Secretary to the Ministry of Finance and Government Chief Whip from 1921 to 1942 and as Minister of Agriculture in the Parliament of Northern Ireland from 1941 to 1943. In May 1950 he succeeded his elder brother Sir Thomas Dixon as third baronet.

Marriage and children
On 25 November 1905 Lord Glentoran married the Hon Emily Ina Florence Bingham, daughter of John Bingham, 5th Baron Clanmorris.  They had five children together:

 Hon Daphne Maude Dixon (died 6 April 1942)
 Hon Anne Lavinia Dixon (died 16 September 1971)
 Hon Angela Ierne Evelyn Dixon (born 16 February 1907, died October 2003), married Lieutenant-Commander the Hon Peter Ross RN (born 8 August 1906, killed in action 14 October 1940), elder son of Una Ross, 25th Baroness de Ros with whom she had two daughters including Georgiana Maxwell, 26th Baroness de Ros.
 Colonel Daniel Stewart Thomas Bingham Dixon, 2nd Baron Glentoran (born 19 January 1912, died 22 July 1995)
 Hon Patricia Clare Dixon (born 1919)

Lord Glentoran died in July 1950, aged 70, and was succeeded in his titles by his son Daniel. Lady Glentoran died in 1957.

Arms

Notes

References 
Kidd, Charles, Williamson, David (editors). Debrett's Peerage and Baronetage (1990 edition). New York: St Martin's Press, 1990,

See also
 List of Northern Ireland Members of the House of Lords

External links 
 
 

Glentoran, Herbert Dixon, 1st Baron
Glentoran, Herbert Dixon, 1st Baron
Glentoran, Herbert Dixon, 1st Baron
Deputy Lieutenants of Down
Glentoran, Herbert Dixon, 1st Baron
Glentoran, Herbert Dixon, 1st Baron
Glentoran, Herbert Dixon, 1st Baron
Glentoran, Herbert Dixon, 1st Baron
High Sheriffs of Kildare
Ulster Unionist Party members of the House of Commons of the United Kingdom
Members of the Parliament of the United Kingdom for Belfast constituencies (1801–1922)
Glentoran, Herbert Dixon, 1st Baron
Members of the Privy Council of Northern Ireland
Glentoran, Herbert Dixon, 1st Baron
UK MPs 1918–1922
Members of the House of Commons of Northern Ireland 1921–1925
Members of the House of Commons of Northern Ireland 1925–1929
Members of the House of Commons of Northern Ireland 1929–1933
Members of the House of Commons of Northern Ireland 1933–1938
Glentoran, Herbert Dixon, 1st Baron
Glentoran, Herbert Dixon, 1st Baron
Glentoran, Herbert Dixon, 1st Baron
Northern Ireland Cabinet ministers (Parliament of Northern Ireland)
Northern Ireland junior government ministers (Parliament of Northern Ireland)
UK MPs 1922–1923
UK MPs 1923–1924
UK MPs 1924–1929
UK MPs 1929–1931
UK MPs 1931–1935
UK MPs 1935–1945
UK MPs who were granted peerages
Members of the House of Commons of Northern Ireland for Belfast constituencies
Ulster Unionist Party members of the House of Commons of Northern Ireland
Ulster Unionist Party hereditary peers
Barons created by George VI